Eleanor Constance "Nornie" Gude (Dec 8 1915 – Jan 24 2002) was an Australian artist.

Early life 
Gude was born in 1915 in Ballarat, Victoria to Stella Rehfisch and Walter Gude, musician and violin teacher, and conductor of the St Patrick's Cathedral orchestra and choir in Ballarat. Her parents met when Stella was 27 and the 42-year old never married Walter was teaching her the violin. Nornie and her sister Gilda were both raised in Ballarat before moving to Melbourne on the eve of World War II.

She was accepted into the Ballarat Technical Art School at 15 because of her advanced skill in painting, and trained there from 1931-1936. She won the esteemed MacRobertson Scholarship in art worth £100 a year. She later went on to the National Gallery School from 1936-1939, studying with Sidney Nolan and Charles Bush, and became the first woman to win the National Gallery Students Travelling Scholarship.

Career 

Gude won many awards for her painting both while at school and throughout her career. In 1958 she went on a study tour through England and Europe. Her works were described by Harold Herbert as "slick and clever." She exhibited with the Victorian Artists Society and the Australian Water Color Institute in Sydney.

Nornie met her husband, fellow painter Laurence Scott Pendlebury, while studying together at the Gallery School. They had two children, Anne and Andrew, both of whom followed artistic pursuits. The family lived in Caulfield, Nornie painting in her studio there.

She once said about art "You spend your first 20 years learning the technique and the next 20 years losing it." Her work is represented in collections at the National Gallery of Victoria, Parliament House, and the Art Gallery of Western Australia, as well as regional collections in Ballarat, Geelong, Castlemaine Art Museum, and Bendigo.

Gude died peacefully at home with her two children in Hawthorn on January 24, 2002.

Awards 

 1941 - National Gallery School Landscape Prize
1948 - F. E. Richardson Prize (Geelong Art Gallery)
1951 - F. E. Richardson Prize
1953 - Perth Art Gallery Prize
 1958 - Voss Smith Prize
 1970 - Pring Prize
 1988 - Doug Moran Naval Prize
 1990 - Doug Moran National Portrait Prize

References

External links 
 Papers of Nornie Gude and Laurence Scott Pendlebury, 1941-2009 [manuscript], State Library Victoria
 Nornie Gude: Australian art and artists file, State Library Victoria
 Works by Nornie Gude at the National Gallery Victoria
 Nornie Gude at the Castlemaine Art Gallery

1915 births
2002 deaths
20th-century Australian women artists
20th-century Australian artists
People from Ballarat
Artists from Victoria (Australia)
National Gallery of Victoria Art School alumni